Babingtonia cherticola is a shrub endemic to Western Australia.

It is found in a small area in the Wheatbelt region of Western Australia.

References

Eudicots of Western Australia
cherticola
Endemic flora of Western Australia
Plants described in 2015
Taxa named by Barbara Lynette Rye
Taxa named by Malcolm Eric Trudgen